Daviesia intricata is a species of flowering plant in the family Fabaceae and is endemic to the south-west of Western Australia. It is a glabrous shrub with densely tangled branches, sharply-pointed, needle-shaped or flattened phyllodes and apricot-yellow and dark red flowers.

Description

Taxonomy and naming
Daviesia intricata was first formally described in 1995 by Michael Crisp in Australian Systematic Botany from specimens he collected in Tutanning Reserve near Pingelly in 1980. The specific epithet (intricata) means "entangled", referring to the habit of this species.

In the same journal article, Crisp described two subspecies, and the names are accepted by the Australian Plant Census:
 Daviesia intricata Crisp subsp. intricata;

Distribution and habitat
Subspecies intricata grows in woodland, mallee, heathland and shrubland between the Charles Gardner Reserve near Tammin, Dumbleyung and Ravensthorpe and subsp. xiphophylla is found in heathland and mallee scrub from near Southern Cross to Marble Rocks east of Hyden.

Conservation status
Both subspecies of D. intricata are listed as "not threatened" by the Department of Biodiversity, Conservation and Attractions.

References

intricata
Eudicots of Western Australia
Plants described in 1995
Taxa named by Michael Crisp